Saika Kawakita (Japanese: 河北彩花) is a Japanese AV idol. She made her debut in 2018, and temporarily retired in March 2019. She later resumed her career in July 2021 and has been active since. She is currently signed to the S1 No. 1 Style label, under the Hokuto Corporation. 

Saika Kawakita has risen very quickly to become one of the most popular JAV actresses in the industry. Despite only appearing in 29 movies as of April 2022, she has garnered international stardom and fans from all over the world.

Career 
Kawakita debuted in April 2018 with Shinjin No. 1 Style Kawakita Saika AV Debut (新人NO.1STYLE 河北彩花AVデビュー), produced by S1. She was successful in the AV world upon her debut. Her works ranked first and fourth in FANZA's 2018 film rankings. Shinjin won the Best Work award in the streaming and rental category at the 2019 FANZA Adult Award.

After five months and six films, Kawakita disappeared from the AV world. During the hiatus, S1 released some unreleased scenes in a compilation. Hong Kong newspaper Oriental Daily News listed Kawakita as one of the models readers would most like to come out of retirement. In a later interview, Kawakita explained that she left because her friends found out about her AV career. 

In 2021, Kawakita announced her return on the magazine FANZA and released her return film, Kawakita Saika Re:Start, on July 14. She has been active ever since, and has quickly risen to become one of the most popular JAV idols of the year. 

As of November 2022, Kawakita has appeared in a total of 44 movies alongside other stars such as Yua Mikami, Rara Anzai, and Konan Sayoi.

References 

1999 births
Living people
Japanese pornographic film actresses